Alfred Brown may refer to:

 Alfred Winsor Brown (1885–1938), Governor of Guam
 Alfred Ernest Brown (British politician) (1881–1962), British politician
 Alfred Brown (cricketer) (1854–1900), Yorkshire cricketer
 Alfred Brown (footballer) (1898–1989), Blackpool, Barnsley and Swindon Town player

Alfred John Brown (born 1897), World War I flying ace of No. 24 Squadron RAF
 Alfred Brown (missionary) (1803–1884), missionary in New Zealand
 Alfred Brown (palaeontologist) (1834–1920), South African palaeontologist, archaeologist and naturalist
 Alfred Lawson Brown (1927–2006), British professor of medieval history
 Alfred Henry Brown (1820–1908), member of the Queensland Legislative Council

See also
Alfred Browne (born 1959), Antigua and Barbuda Olympic sprinter